Murray Irwin "Moe" Norman (July 10, 1929 – September 4, 2004) was a Canadian professional golfer whose accuracy and ability to hit shot after shot perfectly straight gave him the nickname "Pipeline Moe". During his career Norman won 55 tournaments in Canada.

Sam Snead claimed Norman was the game's "greatest striker of the ball", and Tiger Woods said Norman and Ben Hogan were the only two golfers in history to have "owned their swings".

Biography
Born in Kitchener, Ontario, Canada, in 1929, Norman developed his golf from childhood at the Rockway municipal course in that city, starting as a caddie in his pre-teen years. He refined his skills competing against talented area players such as Gary Cowan and Gerry Kesselring. 

Norman spent most of his playing career in poverty. He spent many winters setting pins in a bowling alley for a few cents a line. 

Norman's first win was in 1949, when he won a one-day amateur event at the St. Thomas Golf and Country Club.

Norman won back-to-back Canadian Amateur Championships in 1955 and 1956. He turned professional in 1957 and played briefly on the PGA Tour, but due to shyness, bullying he encountered from certain pros, and a preference to stay in Canada, he stayed primarily in Ontario rather than travel extensively outside Canada. In the 1980s, Norman also played several events on the Senior PGA Tour.

Late in his life, Norman found better financial security when Natural Golf, an instruction company, and Titleist, a major golf manufacturer, signed him to a lifetime contract after he allegedly told a reporter, "Titleist never did nothing for me." Moe would often perform golf exhibitions across Canada –  Wally Uihlein, president of Titleist considered Moe's lifetime contract a "Reverse Scholarship".

Norman died in 2004 in a Kitchener hospital from congestive heart failure, having suffered from the condition since heart bypass surgery six years earlier. He also had a heart attack two years before his death.

Playing style 
Norman was self-taught and never took a golf lesson.

Norman's skills as a ball striker are legendary. Sam Snead described Norman as the greatest striker of the ball. In January 2005, Tiger Woods, the biggest golf star of the modern era, told Golf Digest'''s Jaime Diaz that only two golfers in history have "owned their swings": Moe Norman and Ben Hogan. Stated Woods, "I want to own mine."

Norman's play, along with his way of dressing  were both unconventional. He wore long-sleeved shirts in any weather, buttoned to his chin, and his pants didn’t fit very well. He devised what is known as "The Single Plane Golf Swing" —- rigid arms extended far from his body, a very wide stance with minimal knee bend, shorter-than-usual backswing and extended follow-through with minimal hand action, which produced amazingly accurate ball placement. He played extremely fast, sometimes not slowing to line up his putts. 

Norman was known for sometimes unconventional behavior on the course. It is said that on one hole his caddie told him he could get to the green with a driver and a 9-iron. Naturally, he hit off the tee with his 9-iron and then hit the green with his driver. 

In an exhibition match in 1990 rather than lay up short of a creek hazard which could not be carried, Norman rolled his drive across the bridge which crossed the creek.

Career 
Highlights
Canadian Amateur Championship winner (1955, 1956)
 55 career Canadian Tour and other Canadian event victories
Canadian PGA Championship winner (1966, 1974)
 Canadian PGA Seniors' Championship winner (1979–1985, 1987)
 33 course records
 17 holes-in-one
 Several exhibition rounds under 60 (lowest rounds of golf)
 Inducted into the Canadian Golf Hall of Fame in 1995.
 Inducted into the Ontario Sports Hall of Fame in 1999
 Inducted into the Canada's Sports Hall of Fame in 2006
 Two appearances by invitation as an amateur in the Masters Tournament: 1956 scored 75-78 then withdrew; 1957 scored 77-74 to miss the cut by one stroke

 Team appearances 
Americas Cup (representing Canada): 1954

World Cup (representing Canada): 1971

PGA 
Norman played the PGA Tour beginning in 1959. After a tournament in New Orleans, PGA officials gave Norman a dressing down regarding his playing antics. Feeling let down by the PGA's attitude towards him, Norman returned to Canada to play golf.

Norman's record on the PGA Tour: 
 27 total events played, with 25 cuts made
 1 top ten finish and 7 top 25 finishes
 $7,139 in tournament prize money

Additionally, Norman played on the Senior PGA Tour from 1981 to 1984: 
 5 total events played, making the cut in all 5 events
 1 top three finish and 2 top ten finishes
 A tie for third at the Peter Jackson Champions tournament in 1982, with rounds of 70-69-69-69, winning $10,133 in prize money
 $22,983 in total tournament prize money

Books and films 
Norman's golf achievements and eccentric personality inspired many articles and biographic books including The Feeling of Greatness – The Moe Norman Story, by Tim O'Connor, The Single Plane Golf Swing, Play Better Golf the Moe Norman Way by Todd Graves with Tim O'Connor, Moe Norman: The Canadian Golfing Legend with the Perfect Swing, by Stan Sauerwein, Moe and Me: Encounters with Moe Norman, Golf's Mysterious Genius by Lorne Rubinstein,, Finish To The Sky, by Greg Lavern and Send In The Clown by Andrew Stelmack

A documentary film about Norman's life, The Feeling of Greatness, was in production, and scheduled for completion in December 2018.

Another film, Dance the Green'' was also in production as of 2011. Wayne Gretzky was one of the investors.

References

External links
 www.moenorman.org
Profile at Canadian Sports Hall of Fame
Moe Norman Golf website
The Moe Norman Documentary
Moe Norman Golf Swing Interview Part 1
Moe Norman Golf Swing Interview Part 2
Norman's swing on a driving range in 1987 on youtube

 

Canadian male golfers
Golfing people from Ontario
Sportspeople from Kitchener, Ontario
1929 births
2004 deaths